Wanchalerm Yingyong (born August 12, 1993) is a Thai professional footballer who plays as a defensive midfielder or centre back for Thai League 1 club Nongbua Pitchaya.

Club career

Honours

Club
PT Prachuap FC
 Thai League Cup (1) : 2019

External links

 Profile at Goal
https://int.soccerway.com/players/wanchalerm-yingyong/334108/

1993 births
Living people
Wanchalerm Yingyong
Wanchalerm Yingyong
Association football defenders
Association football midfielders
Wanchalerm Yingyong
Wanchalerm Yingyong
Wanchalerm Yingyong
Wanchalerm Yingyong